is a railway station in the city of Iwata, Shizuoka Prefecture, Japan, operated by the third sector Tenryū Hamanako Railroad.

Lines
Toyooka Station is served by the Tenryū Hamanako Line, and is located 23.0 kilometers from the starting point of the line at Kakegawa Station.

Station layout
The station has two opposed side platforms connected by a level crossing. The wooden station building is unattended.

Adjacent stations

|-
!colspan=5|Tenryū Hamanako Railroad

Station history
Scheduled freight services were discontinued from February 1964. After the privatization of JNR on March 15, 1987, the station came under the control of the Tenryū Hamanako Line and was renamed to its present name. The station was rebuilt in 2003 through the efforts of the local Chamber of Commerce, and an additional platform was added at that time.

Passenger statistics
In fiscal 2016, the station was used by an average of 77 passengers daily (boarding passengers only).

Surrounding area
Toyooka Kita Elementary School

See also
 List of Railway Stations in Japan

External links

  Tenryū Hamanako Railroad Station information 
 

Railway stations in Shizuoka Prefecture
Railway stations in Japan opened in 1940
Stations of Tenryū Hamanako Railroad
Iwata, Shizuoka